Bonus Books is an American book publisher based in Los Angeles, California. The company publishes approximately 30 books per year, primarily "how to" books on subjects such as casino gambling, sports biographies, broadcasting and journalism. Frequent authors include Frank Scoblete and John Grochowski.  An additional imprint is Volt Press.

History
The company was established in the 1970s and was based in Chicago, Illinois until 2002, when it was acquired by a Los Angeles publishing executive, Jeffrey Stern, who had previously published Details magazine.

Bonus Books is currently owned by Rowman & Littlefield.

Selected titles
 The Divorce Lawyers’ Guide to Staying Married
 Best Newspaper Writing
 Broadcast Voice Handbook
 Get the Edge
 Covering Catastrophe
 The Slot Machine Answer Book
 Straight Whisky : A Living History of Sex, Drugs, and Rock ‘n’ Roll on the Sunset Strip
 Funding Evil: How Terrorism is Financed and How to Stop It

References

External Sources
 

Companies based in Los Angeles
Book publishing companies based in California
Publishing companies established in 1972